Genlis is a commune in the Côte-d'Or department in eastern France. The 20th-century archaeologist Jean Charbonneaux (1895–1969) was born in Genlis.

Geography 
The city of Genlis is located in the Côte-d'Or department in Bourgogne-Franche-Comté region and belongs to the Dijon arrondissement and Genlis canton. All villages are in Côte-d'Or.

The Tille and Norges rivers are the main waterways crossing Genlis. There is also the Creux-Jacques stream.

Transportation
The commune has a railway station, on the Dijon–Vallorbe line.

History

Etymology and toponymy of Genlis 
In 867, Genlis was written Gediacensis finis, a spelling which probably originates from the Gallo-Roman name Aegidius or Genelius, the ancestor of the French first name Gilles because the Greek "D" often turns into an "L" in Latin.

The city of Genlis was not historically referred to by its modern name. Cartularies, including those of the Saint-Bénigne abbeys (future cathedrals), Tart, Clairvaux, and Cîteaux; chronicles, such as those of Bèze and Saint-Bénigne; and departmental archives all give details on the name's evolution over time. During Carolingian times, Genlis was called Getliacus. It was then called Gediacnesis finis in 867, Gliniacensis finis (868), Janlint (~1060), Genliacensis finis (11th century), Genlé/Genleium (1132), Genleio (1180), Janlée (1191), Jamleium (1234), Genlliacum (1235), Janli (1236), Genllé (1238), Janleium (1248), Genlerum (1249), Janlé (1260), Janleyum (1297), Genleyum (1285), Janley (1290), Jenlleium (1297), Jamley (1360), Jamleyum (14th century), Janly (1498), Janlis (1637), Jenlis (1666), Janlys (1679), Jeanlis (1685), Jeanly (1728), and Genlis/Janly in 1783. The name Genlis seems to have disappeared by the end of the 18th century.

First written account 

The first written account that mentions Genlis dates back to approximately 866. It is referred to as Finis Genliacensis (area of Genlis) in the chronicles of Saint Bénigne during a "malle" or "placite" held in Lux. A placite was a public political assembly gathering the main civil servants, such as bishops, counts, and abbots, who were the King's advisors. These events were held in May or October.

The second oldest reference to Genlis was made around 1060. Berno, from Genlis, gives Saint-Pierre de Bèze a property he owns in the Coriant village (which has since disappeared), keeping incomes for him all his life. He was a farm owner, not a lord, as emphasized in the Latin deed:

Roman and Gallo-Roman eras 

The Genlis site has been occupied since the time of the Romans. A hidden post that would be the starting point of a Roman road, also called Chemin des Romains or Brunehau roads, proves the Romans had a military presence in the area. In 1973, a Gallo-Roman villa was found by aerial search."Inside of the Gallo-Roman castrum, recognized thanks to its angle towers and its double surrounding walls, there were traces of scattered buildings, most of them having only a single room, appearing disorderly lines that date to modern times. Could these buildings be rural settlements close to the fortress?"The Chemin des Romains linked Genlis to Arceau. On this part of the road, several archaeological discoveries were made, such as at Izier, Cessey-sur-Tille, Bressey-sur-Tille and Arc-sur-Tille. Arc-sur-Tille was the intersection of the Roman road coming from Genlis and the road leading from Besançon-Alise-Sainte-Reine to Alise. A bronze statuette of the high-empire and two statuettes of Mercury were found during excavations. Bressey-sur-Tille was located on the road to Arcelot to the north and Genlis to the south. Finally, the Chemin des Romains linked the nearby Arceau village to Dijon and Mirebeau.

Archaeological digs of the areas "le Johannot" and "la Voie Romaine" (located between Genlis and Izier) revealed artifacts dating from the Final Tène. The Gallo-Roman period is represented by remains of a cremation necropolis (1 AD) located on "le Johannot". Several vases and pieces of Gaulish currency were found at the edge of "la Voie romaine". Gaulish ceramic and amphora shards from 1 AD were discovered in a ditch between the sites, and the remains of a Merovingian village were also found nearby.

Merovingian Genlis 
In the early 1990s, the planning works of Highway A39 Dijon-Dole unearthed the ruins of a Merovingian village in "le Johannot" and "la Borde". These digs revealed the existence of twenty-nine wooden semi-buried rectangular buildings called "bottoms of huts". They served a variety of purposes, including "storehouses, storages, shelters for small animals" and "handmade workshops (weaving, metalworking, bronze or bones works)".

Other kinds of buildings were identified as houses by the remains of several pole holes. These homes differed in shapes and dimensions. Additional small structures are thought to be granaries on stakes, silos that "showed samples of rye, wheat seeds, elderberries, pear tree, millet, cabbage, [and] black nightshade but also wild plants, reflecting pictures of cultivated and meadow (fodder crops) surfaces". These Genlisians from the seventh century were growers and farmers, confirmed by barns of cows, pigs, goats, poultry and horses. The last structures visible are ditches, fences and pathways.

Three graves were found during the digs. The first contained the skeleton of a "young male adult measuring approximately 1.66 meters (5.4 feet). [...] The second individual was buried in the same position, about 30 to 40 meters (98 to 131 feet) from the first one. He was an old adult [...]. Several degenerative wounds of a kind of arthrosis was observed, mostly in the vertebras. [...] The subject was wearing a plated iron buckle which seems to be dating from the early seventh century. A third person was pulled out [...]. He was a young male teenager [...] and was wearing a bronze buckle from the sixth century."

"Within the excavated items, we could have found ceramic shards of tumblers, bowls, cooking pots, jugs and vases. Metallic furnitures included nails, a small bell, a twisted poker, knives, etc."

Feudal era 
From the feudal era until the French Revolution, which would remove its benefits, the territory of Genlis was a seigneury. In the 18th century, Abbot Courtépée, in his Description générale et particulière du Duché de Bourgogne, narrates that under the Old Regime, Genlis was also a parish of the Châlon-sur-Saône diocese under the  archpriest of Mailly, the patronage of Saint Martin and patronage of Saint-Vivant priory. From a feudal point of view, the Genlis seigneury was a back-fiefdom because it was part of the Mirebeau seigneury, then marquisate, where lords pledged homage to the Duke of Burgundy. Huchey was part of Genlis, and Athée and Magny close to Auxonne were attached to Genlis. In the 18th century, Genlis counted 80 burners and 400 communicants, as well as Huchey. The market was held on Thursday and two fairs per year.

Feudal marks are, for instance, the fortified manor house – then castle – of Genlis, as well as many rights and privileges that lords were benefiting. Janly lords and the people that owned properties in Genlis were also benefiting rights and privileges.

Homage 

The hommage was demanded between the suzerain and the vassal to ensure stability and peace. So in 1340, the venerable Father Pouçard, abbot of Saint-Étienne de Dijon and owner in Genlis, got the homage of Symon, along with Raymond de Chailly and Jean Cultivier, of the Dijon church and tabellion juror, who admitted he "owned a fief by his wife name, of the aforementioned abbot the meadows he owns in an isle of the Janley area, which are linking fields of the abbot, and about these meadows as monastery fiefdom, Symon, as vassal and man of the abbot on behalf of the monastery, pledged faith and homage of the kiss that the abbot gave to him on the mouth, in accordance with the tradition, promising him loyalty. Done, the abbot asked to establish an official act that would be sealed with the Langres church seal".

Population

Twinning 
Genlis is twinned with two other European cities:

  Sprendlingen, in Germany
  Bogdanesti, in Romania

See also
Communes of the Côte-d'Or department

References

Bibliography

External links 

  

Communes of Côte-d'Or